William de la Founte  (died 1495) was a Bristol merchant who became one of the first English entrepreneurs to profit from the slave trade.

de la Founte had established his business interests in Lisbon and from 1480 also in Huelva, Andalusia. He participated in the trafficking of slaves to the soap industry in Lower Andalusia.

de la Founte provided surety for Wiliam Weston in 1490.

References

1495 deaths
Businesspeople from Bristol
Year of birth unknown
English slave traders